Caribbean Helicopters Limited was founded in 1995.  The air charter airline is based in Antigua and provides services to Anguilla, Montserrat, Saint Kitts and Nevis, Dominica and other islands.

Fleet information
The current fleet consists of one Bell 206 JetRanger II, two Bell 206 LongRanger, 2 Piper Navajo & 1 Britten-Norman BN-2 Islander.

References

External links
 

1995 establishments in Antigua and Barbuda
Airlines established in 1995
Airlines of Antigua and Barbuda
Helicopter airlines